Masaka–Mutukula Road is a road in the Central Region of Uganda, connecting the town of Masaka, in Masaka District, to the border town of Mutukula in Rakai District.

Location
The road stars in Masaka, near the Uganda Police barracks, where this road forms a T-junction with Broadway Road.

Overview
This road is part of the East African Community Road Network Project. It is the main road transport corridor between Uganda and Tanzania. Section (b) was in  good condition, as of 2006, while section (a) was in need of an upgrade.

Upgrade and expansion
In January 2020, the government of Uganda began preparations to upgrade and expand the road, using funds sourced from the African Development Bank. The single-carriageway road will be upgraded to class II bitumen surface, with culverts and drainage channels. In the town of Kyotera, the width will be further increased to accommodate a  parking lane.

See also
 List of roads in Uganda

References

External links
 Website of Uganda National Roads Authority

Roads in Uganda
Masaka District
Kyotera District